Arnold Schlaet (1859–1946) was a U.S. oil industrialist and business man.

Biography
In 1901, Schlaet, with Jim Hogg, John Warne Gates, and Joseph S. Cullinan, founded the Texas Fuel Company, predecessor to Texaco Incorporated. Schlaet was an agent from New York City who worked for the United States Leather Company, owned by John J. and Lewis Henry Lapham.  Naturally conservative, he was nevertheless impressed with Cullinan's plans, and helped him to gain capital to start the new venture.

References

Texaco's History - Founders

External links

1859 births
1946 deaths
Texaco people
American businesspeople in the oil industry

19th-century American businesspeople